Keilhaus topp is a mountain in Lom Municipality in Innlandet county, Norway. It is one of Norway's highest mountains, but is not always included in rankings due to its topographic prominence of only . The mountain is surrounded by several other notable mountains including Galdhøpiggen (Norway's tallest mountain) to the west, Veslpiggen to the northwest, Galdhøi and Juvvasshøi to the north, Store Styggehøe to the southeast, Midtre Tverråtinden to the south, and Svellnosbreahesten and Store Tverråtinden to the southwest.

Name
The professor Baltazar Mathias Keilhau, together with two students, tried to reach the top of Galdhøpiggen in 1844 - but he had to stop here because of bad weather.

See also
List of mountains of Norway by height

References

Jotunheimen
Galdhøpiggen
Lom, Norway
Mountains of Innlandet